Otter Creek is a stream in Clay and Vigo counties, in the U.S. state of Indiana. It is a tributary of the Wabash River.

Otter Creek was so named for the otters seen there by early settlers.

See also
List of rivers of Indiana

References

Rivers of Clay County, Indiana
Rivers of Vigo County, Indiana
Rivers of Indiana